The 1925–26 National Football League was the 1st staging of the National Football League, a Gaelic football tournament for the Gaelic Athletic Association county teams of Ireland.

The inaugural NFL was won by Laois, captained by Dick Miller. They defeated Sligo in the semi-final after a lost game was ordered replayed, and beat Dublin in a low-scoring final despite losing two players, Paddy Lenihan and Bill Keeley, to emigration shortly before the final.

Format 
The league was organised on a provincial basis with a separate league for each province: three leagues for Leinster due to the large number of counties. The six league winners played a knockout tournament to decide the National Football League. It is mentioned that the three Leinster Group winners played off (Longford scratching, Laois beating Dublin) for a gold medal, but this does not seem to have formed part of the league proper.

Knockout stage qualifiers
 Leinster: 3 teams
 Munster: 1 team
 Connacht: 1 team
 Ulster: 1 team

Group stage

Connacht (Connacht Railway Cup)

Results

Leinster I

Results

Table

Leinster II

Results

Table

Westmeath forfeited the points from their win v Offaly due to being late on the field

Leinster III

Results

Table

Munster (Munster Football League)

Ulster (Dr McKenna Cup)

North-West Group

Regulation games

Play-Offs

North-East Group

Regulation games

Play-Offs

Final

Final standings

North-West Group

North-East Group

Knockout stage

Quarter-finals

Semi-finals

An objection was successfully made and a replay ordered.

Final

Leinster League inter-group ties

The game was initially awarded to Longford as Dublin failed to finish owing to a disputed decision. Later, the Leinster Council declared the result void and ordered a replay.

Match was abandoned with seven minutes remaining. The game was awarded to Dublin

Longford did not play in protest at the fact that Game 1 replay versus Dublin was awarded to Dublin

Table

Laois won the Leinster Football League. This would appear to have been a separate competition, and this ties did not form part of the National Football League proper.

References

National Football League
National Football League
National Football League (Ireland) seasons